Countess Margarethe von Hanau-Lichtenberg, known upon her marriage as Margarethe, Countess of Nassau-Wiesbaden-Idstein (15 May 1463 – 26 May 1504) was a German noblewoman who, as the wife of Adolf III of Nassau-Wiesbaden-Idstein, was the Countess of Nassau-Wiesbaden and Nassau-Idstein.

Biography 
Margarethe was the daughter of Philipp I, Count of Hanau-Lichtenberg and Anna von Lichtenberg. Her father ruled over the county of Hanau-Lichtenberg and, after the death of her maternal grandfather, the Lordship of Lichtenberg. She was a younger sister of Philipp II, Count of Hanau-Lichtenberg.

On 20 June 1484 she married Adolf III, Count of Nassau-Wiesbaden. They had four children:

 Countess Maria Margaret (1487–1548), who married in 1502 to Louis I, Count of Nassau-Weilburg
 Countess Anna (1488–1550), married in 1506 to Henry XXXI of Schwarzburg-Sondershausen,
 Philip I, Count of Nassau-Wiesbaden-Idstein (1490–1558), who succeeded her husband as Count of Nassau-Wiesbaden-Idstein.

In 1509 her husband succeeded his childless brother, Philip, Count of Nassau-Idstein, as the Count of Nassau-Idenstein, therefore making Margarethe a countess of Idenstein.

She died on 26 May 1504.

References 

1463 births
1504 deaths
15th-century German women
16th-century German women
Countesses of Nassau
Margarethe
German countesses